Beeney is a surname. Notable people with the surname include:

 Aaron Beeney (born 1984), English darts player
 Mark Beeney (born 1967), English footballer and coach
 Mitchell Beeney (born 1995), English footballer

See also
 Deeney
 Feeney
 Seeney